Francis Kojo Arthur is the member of parliament for the constituency. He was elected on the ticket of the National Democratic Congress (NDC) and won a majority of 3,474 votes to become the MP. He succeeded Joe Kingsley Hackman who had represented the constituency in the 4th Republic parliament on the ticket of the New Patriotic Party (NPP).

See also
List of Ghana Parliament constituencies

References 

Parliamentary constituencies in the Central Region (Ghana)